United States v Iran, played on 21 June 1998, was a football match between Iran and the United States in the group stage of the 1998 FIFA World Cup at the Stade de Gerland in Lyon, France. The match, which is described as the "mother of all games" and the "most politically charged game in World Cup history", ended with a 2–1 victory for Iran, the team's first ever victory in the history of the FIFA World Cup.

Hamid Estili and Mehdi Mahdavikia scored for Iran, while Brian McBride scored for the United States.

Background 
Since the overthrow of the pro-Western (see 1953 Iranian coup d'état for more details) Shah of Iran, Mohammad Reza Pahlavi, due to the Iranian revolution, and the attack on the American embassy in Iran, and the American support for Iraq during the Iran-Iraq war, relations between the two countries had been hostile.

According to FIFA regulations, teams in each match are classified as team A or team B. Team B, Iran in this match, typically walks towards team A for the pre-match handshakes. The supreme leader of Iran, Ali Khamenei, "gave express orders that the Iranian team must not walk towards the Americans". Mehrdad Masoudi, one of the FIFA media officers of the match, negotiated with the US team, and as a result, the Americans walked towards the Iranians.

During a delicately choreographed pregame ceremony, the Iranian players gifted white roses to their American opponents as a symbol of peace.

Match

Details

Aftermath 
A major upset, the match was described by The New York Times as a "historic victory" for Iran. Although the Iranian government took steps to reign in celebrations after the countrywide uproar when Iran qualified for the World Cup, thousands of fans publicly reveled in Tehran, including women without headscarves.

The resignation of Sampson has been partially attributed to the match, as some American players alleged that poor team management led to the loss.

The match had a profound impact on the career of Iranian-American Afshin Ghotbi, who was working as part of the technical staff of the USMNT. The emotional game between the United States and Iran persuaded Afshin into entering the path as a football coach, ultimately went on to take charge of the Iranian national team from 2009 to 2011, the first American to coach Iran.

Jeff Agoos, a former US defender, said that "We did more in 90 minutes than the politicians did in 20 years." Eighteen months later, the teams played a friendly match at Pasadena just outside of Los Angeles, home to the largest population of Iranian Americans outside Iran. The game finished in a 1–1 draw.

As Germany drew with Yugoslavia in the earlier group match and both finished with four points after two matches, the United States were eliminated from reaching the knockout stage after losing to Iran. Iran lost to Germany and were therefore eliminated as well, while the United States lost their final group match to Yugoslavia.

2022 FIFA World Cup rematch 
Iran and the United States met again at the 2022 FIFA World Cup in Qatar on November 29, in their final match of Group B. Facing elimination upon a draw or a loss, the United States defeated Iran 1–0 by a lone goal from Christian Pulisic, advancing to the round of 16 and eliminating Iran.

See also 

 Iran–United States relations

References 

FIFA World Cup matches
1998 FIFA World Cup
Iran–United States relations
United States men's national soccer team matches
Iran national football team matches
United States at the 1998 FIFA World Cup
Iran at the 1998 FIFA World Cup
Politics and sports
June 1998 sports events in Europe
20th century in Lyon